Lasell Hall, also known as D.A.R. Hall, is a historic home located at Schoharie in Schoharie County, New York which was listed on the National Register of Historic Places in 2002. It was built around 1795 is a -story, five-bay timber framed Federal-style house, with several wings in the back. It was designed to be both a tavern and a residence. Since 1913, it has been owned and maintained by the Schoharie Chapter of the Daughters of the American Revolution.

References

Houses on the National Register of Historic Places in New York (state)
Federal architecture in New York (state)
Houses completed in 1795
Houses in Schoharie County, New York
Daughters of the American Revolution
National Register of Historic Places in Schoharie County, New York